Agneta Myhrman Lilliesköld (born 11 November 1994) is a Swedish beauty queen who was crowned Miss World Sweden on 8 June and represented Sweden at Miss World 2013 in Bali, Indonesia.

Myhrman was born and lives in Stockholm.

References

External links
Agneta Myhrman official blog

Swedish beauty pageant winners
Miss World 2013 delegates
1994 births
Living people